Kristina Hautala (born 28 June 1948, Stockholm) is a Swedish-Finnish former singer who rose to success in Finland in the late 1960s.

Beginnings/ stardom
Born in Stockholm of Finnish descent, Hautala was still living in her native city when she made her recording debut with "En koskaan", a Finnish rendering of "You Don't Have to Say You Love Me",  recorded 24 May 1966. Entering the Finnish Top Ten in November 1966, "En koskaan" spent 11 weeks there, peaking at #6. Hautala resultantly became an in-demand television and live performer in Finland: she toured nationally in the summer of 1967 with Johnny and that autumn and winter she headlined with Lasse Mårtenson in a two-month engagement that set a new box-office record for the Café Adlon, Helsinki's premier entertainment venue. Hautala continued her recording career with 11 singles released by 1969, her recording output typified by Finnish covers of English-language recordings such as "Rakkautta vain" (the Beatles' "All You Need is Love") and covers of international hits such as "Voinko luottaa", whose original, "Io ti darò di più" was an Italian hit for Ornella Vanoni.

Eurovision 1968
On 10 February 1968, Hautala appeared in the televised Finnish preliminary round for the Eurovision Song Contest as one of six singers competing to represent Finland at Eurovision 1968. 1968 marked the first time the Eurovision entry for Finland, a contender since 1961, was selected by the votes of the television viewing audience who were asked to mail in ballots: the result, announced 17 February 1968, was that Kristina Hautala's number, "Kun kello käy", was the top vote-getter and would be Finland's entrant at Eurovision 1968 held 6 April 1968 at the Royal Albert Hall in London.

Hautala's performance on the competition night drew a single vote with a resultant finish ranked 16th of 17, tied for last place with the Netherlands' entrant "Morgen" by Ronnie Tober. While two of Finland's prior Eurovision bids had received zero points, in neither instance had the relevant song been viewed as a real contender: "Kun kello käy"'s poor showing  at Eurovision 1968 consolidated the long-standing perception of that nation's Eurovision participation being risible.

"Kun kello käy" was a chart disappointment for Hautala in Finland, failing to reach the Top Ten there although it did reach #12: an attempt was made to bolster the song's popularity by having Hautala cut a Swedish version, "Vänta Och Se" whose lyrics were written by Stig Anderson.

Later life
In 1970 Hautala left her longtime label Scandia and debuted on EMI-Columbia with "Kop kop, ken lie?", a Finnish cover of "Knock, Knock Who's There?", which proved to be her last evident release as a career recording artist. In 1972 she returned to her native Stockholm to attend university, subsequently working as a psychologist and art therapist. She making a one-off return to singing in 2003 with the album Hetki tää,  a collaboration with the Matti Viita-aho Group.

Singles discography

References

1948 births
Living people
Singers from Stockholm
Swedish people of Finnish descent
Swedish expatriates in Finland
Eurovision Song Contest entrants of 1968
Eurovision Song Contest entrants for Finland
Swedish women singers